The 1977–78 United Counties League season was the 71st in the history of the United Counties League, a football competition in England.

Premier Division

The Premier Division featured 19 clubs which competed in the division last season, along with one new club:
Eynesbury Rovers, promoted from Division One

League table

Division One

The Division One featured 17 clubs which competed in the division last season, along with 3 new clubs:
Vauxhall Motors, relegated from the Premier Division
Stewart & Lloyds Corby reserves, promoted from Division Two 
Byfield Athletic, promoted from Division Two

League table

Division Two

The Division Two featured 14 clubs which competed in the division last season, along with 3 new clubs:
Towcester Town, transferred from the South Midlands League
Ford Sports Daventry
Eynesbury Rovers reserves

League table

References

External links
 United Counties League

1977–78 in English football leagues
United Counties League seasons